Ruth Donnelly (19 January 1920 – 4 April 2009) was an American chess player.

Biography
From 1972 to 1989, she participated in nine United States Women's Chess Championship, achieving her strongest finish in 1972 winning 3rd place. In 1973, she participated in the Women's World Chess Championship Interzonal Tournament in Menorca and shared 17th-18th place with Linda Maddern. Twice in 1992 and 1993 she won the bronze medal at the World Senior Women's Chess Championships.

References

External links

Ruth Donnelly chess games at 365Chess.com

1920 births
2009 deaths
American female chess players
Women's Championship
20th-century chess players
20th-century American women
21st-century American women